Saraiki (also spelt Siraiki, or  Seraiki) is an Indo-Aryan language of the Lahnda  group, spoken by 26 million people primarily in the south-western half of the province of Punjab in Pakistan. It was previously known as Multani, after its main dialect.

Saraiki has partial mutual intelligibility with Standard Punjabi, and it shares with it a large portion of its vocabulary and morphology. At the same time in its phonology it is radically different (particularly in the lack of tones, the preservation of the voiced aspirates and the development of implosive consonants), and has important grammatical features in common with the Sindhi language spoken to the south.

The Saraiki language identity arose in the 1960s, encompassing more narrow local earlier identities (like Multani, Derawi or Riasati), and distinguishing itself from broader ones like that of Punjabi.

Name

It has been in use for much longer in Sindh to refer to the speech of the immigrants from the north, principally Siraiki-speaking Baloch tribes who settled there between the 16th and the 19th centuries. In this context, the term can most plausibly be explained as originally having had the meaning "the language of the north", from the Sindhi word  'up-river, north'. This name can ambiguously refer to the northern dialects of Sindhi, but these are nowadays more commonly known as "Siroli" or "Sireli".

An alternative hypothesis is that Sarākī originated in the word sauvīrā, or Sauvira, an ancient kingdom which was also mentioned in the Sanskrit epic Mahabharata.

Currently, the most common rendering of the name is Saraiki. However, Seraiki and Siraiki have also been used in academia until recently. Precise spelling aside, the name was first adopted in the 1960s by regional social and political leaders.

Classification and related languages

Saraiki is a member of the Indo-Aryan subdivision of the Indo-Iranian branch of the Indo-European language family.

In 1919, Grierson maintained that the dialects of what is now the southwest of Punjab Province in Pakistan constitute a dialect cluster, which he designated "Southern Lahnda" within a putative "Lahnda language". Subsequent Indo-Aryanist linguists have confirmed the reality of this dialect cluster, even while rejecting the name "Southern Lahnda" along with the entity "Lahnda" itself. Grierson also maintained that "Lahnda" was his novel designation for various dialects up to then called "Western Punjabi", spoken north, west, and south of Lahore. The local dialect of Lahore is the Majhi dialect of Punjabi, which has long been the basis of standard literary Punjabi. However, outside of Indo-Aryanist circles, the concept of "Lahnda" is still found in compilations of the world's languages (e.g. Ethnologue).

Dialects
The following dialects have been tentatively proposed for Saraiki:
Central Saraiki, including Multani: spoken in the districts of Dera Ghazi Khan, Muzaffargarh, Leiah, Multan and Bahawalpur.
Southern Saraiki: prevalent in the districts of Rajanpur and Rahimyar Khan.
Sindhi Saraiki: dispersed throughout the province of Sindh.
Northern Saraiki, or Thali: spoken in the district of Dera Ismail Khan and the northern parts of the Thal region, including Mianwali District and Bhakkar District 
Eastern Saraiki: transitional to Punjabi and spoken in the Bar region along the boundary with the eastern Majhi dialect. This group includes the dialects of Jhangi and Shahpuri. 

The historical inventory of names for the dialects now called Saraiki is a confusion of overlapping or conflicting ethnic, local, and regional designations. One historical name for Saraiki, Jaṭki, means "of the Jaṭṭs", a northern South Asian ethnic group. Only a small minority of Saraiki speakers are Jaṭṭs, and not all Saraiki speaking Jaṭṭs necessarily speak the same dialect of Saraiki. However, these people usually call their traditions as well as language as Jataki. Conversely, several Saraiki dialects have multiple names corresponding to different locales or demographic groups. The name "Derawali" is used to refer to the local dialects of both Dera Ghazi Khan and Dera Ismail Khan, but "Ḍerawali" in the former is the Multani dialect and "Derawali" in the latter is the Thaḷi dialect.

When consulting sources before 2000, it is important to know that Pakistani administrative boundaries have been altered frequently. Provinces in Pakistan are divided into districts, and sources on "Saraiki" often describe the territory of a dialect or dialect group according to the districts. Since the founding of Pakistan in 1947, several of these districts have been subdivided, some multiple times.

Status of language or dialect
In the context of South Asia, the choice between the appellations "language" and "dialect" is a difficult one, and any distinction made using these terms is obscured by their ambiguity. In a sense both Siraiki and Standard Panjabi are "dialects" of a "Greater Punjabi" macrolanguage.

Saraiki was considered a dialect of Punjabi by most British colonial administrators, and is still seen as such by many Punjabis. Saraikis, however, consider it a language in its own right and see the use of the term "dialect" as stigmatising.
A language movement was started in the 1960s to standardise a script and promote the language. The national census of Pakistan has tabulated the prevalence of Saraiki speakers since 1981.

Geographical distribution

Pakistan
Saraiki is primarily spoken in the south-western part of the province of Punjab, in an area that broadly coincides with the extent of the proposed Saraikistan province. To the west, it is set off from the Pashto- and Balochi-speaking areas by the Suleiman Range, while to the south-east the Thar desert divides it from the Marwari language. Its other boundaries are less well-defined: Punjabi is spoken to the east; Sindhi is found to the south, after the border with Sindh province; to the north, the southern edge of the Salt Range is the rough divide with the northern varieties of Lahnda.

Saraiki is the first language of 25.9 million people in Pakistan according to the 2017 census. 
The first national census of Pakistan to gather data on the prevalence of Saraiki was the census of 1981. In that year, the percentage of respondents nationwide reporting Saraiki as their native language was 9.83. In the census of 1998, it was 10.53% out of a national population of 132 million, for a figure of 13.9 million Saraiki speakers resident in Pakistan. Also according to the 1998 census, 12.8 million of those, or 92%, lived in the province of Punjab.

India
After Partition in 1947, Hindu and Sikh speakers of Saraiki migrated to India, where they are currently widely dispersed, though with more significant pockets in the states of Punjab, Haryana, Rajasthan, Uttar Pradesh, Delhi and Jammu and Kashmir. There is also a smaller group of Muslim pastoralists who migrated to India, specifically Andhra Pradesh, prior to Partition.

However, these are not representative of the actual numbers, as the speakers will often refer to their language using narrower dialect or regional labels, or alternatively identify with the bigger language communities, like those of Punjabi, Hindi or Urdu. Therefore, the number of speakers in India remains unknown. There have been observations of Lahnda varieties "merging" into Punjabi (especially in Punjab and Delhi), as well as of outright shift to the dominant languages of Punjabi or Hindi. One pattern reported in the 1990s was for members of the younger generation to speak the respective "Lahnda" variety with their grandparents, while communicating within the peer group in Punjabi and speaking to their children in Hindi.

Phonology
Saraiki's consonant inventory is similar to that of neighbouring Sindhi. It includes phonemically distinctive implosive consonants, which are unusual among the Indo-European languages. In Christopher Shackle's analysis, Saraiki distinguishes up to 48 consonants and 9 monophthong vowels.

Vowels
The "centralised" vowels  tend to be shorter than the "peripheral" vowels . The central vowel  is more open and back than the corresponding vowel in neighbouring varieties. Vowel nasalisation is distinctive:  'may you go' vs.  'may he go'. There is a high number of vowel sequences, some of which can be analysed as diphthongs.

Consonants
Saraiki possesses a large inventory of consonants:

In its stop consonants, Saraiki has the typical for Indo-Aryan four-fold contrast between voiced and voiceless, and aspirated and unaspirated. In parallel to Sindhi it has additionally developed a set of implosives, so that for each place of articulation there are up to five contrasting stops, for example:  voiceless  'custom' ∼ aspirated  'blister' ∼ implosive  'cobweb' ∼ voiced  'niche' ∼ voiced aspirate  'foam'.

There are five contrasting places of articulation for the stops: velar, palatal, retroflex, dental and bilabial. The dentals  are articulated with the blade of the tongue against the surface behind the teeth. The retroflex stops are post-alveolar, the articulator being the tip of the tongue or sometimes the underside.
There is no dental implosive, partly due to the lesser retroflexion with which the retroflex implosive  is pronounced.

The retroflex  is a realised as a true nasal only if adjacent to a retroflex stop, elsewhere it is a nasalised retroflex flap . The contrasts  ∼ , and  ∼  are weak; the single nasal is more common in southern varieties, and the nasal + stop cluster is prevalent in central dialects. Three nasals  have aspirated counterparts .

The realisation of the alveolar tap  varies with the phonetic environment. It contrasts with the retroflex flap  ( 'wire' ∼  'watching'), except in the variety spoken by Hindus. The fricatives  are labio-dental. The glottal fricative  is voiced and affects the voice quality of a preceding vowel.

Phonotactics and stress
There are no tones in Saraiki. All consonants except  can be geminated ("doubled"). Geminates occur only after stressed centralised vowels, and are phonetically realised much less markedly than in the rest of the Punjabi area.

A stressed syllable is distinguished primarily by its length: if the vowel is peripheral  then it is lengthened, and if it is a "centralised vowel" then the consonant following it is geminated. Stress normally falls on the first syllable of a word. The stress will, however, fall on the second syllable of a two-syllable word if the vowel in the first syllable is centralised, and the second syllable contains either a diphthong, or a peripheral vowel followed by a consonant, for example  'carpenter'. Three-syllable words are stressed on the second syllable if the first syllable contains a centralised vowel, and the second syllable has either a peripheral vowel, or a centralised vowel + geminate, for example  'seventy-four'. There are exceptions to these rules and they account for minimal pairs like  'informing' and  'so much'.

Implosives
Unusually for South Asian languages, implosive consonants are found in Sindhi, possibly some Rajasthani dialects, and Saraiki, which has the following series: /   /.

The "palatal"  is denti-alveolar and laminal, articulated further forward than most other palatals.

The "retroflex"  is articulated with the tip or the underside of the tongue, further forward in the mouth than the plain retroflex stops. It has been described as post-alveolar, pre-palatal or pre-retroflex.  reports that this sound is unique in Indo-Aryan and that speakers of Multani take pride in its distinctiveness. The plain voiced  and the implosive  are mostly in complementary distribution although there are a few minimal pairs, like  'doctor' ∼  'mail'. The retroflex implosive alternates with the plain voiced dental stop  in the genitive postposition/suffix , which takes the form of  when combined with 1st or 2nd person pronouns:  'my',  'your'.

A dental implosive is found in the northeastern Jhangi dialect, which is characterised by a lack of phonemic contrast between implosives and plain stops, and a preference for implosives even in words where Saraiki has a plain stop. The dental implosive in Jhangi is articulated with the tongue completely covering the upper teeth. It is not present in Saraiki, although  contends that it should be reconstructed for the earlier language.

Aspirated (breathy voiced) implosives occur word-initially, where they contrast with aspirated plain stops:  'sit' ~  'fear'. The aspiration is not phonemic; it is phonetically realised on the whole syllable, and results from an underlying  that follows the vowel, thus  is phonemically .

The historical origin of the Saraiki implosives has been on the whole the same as in Sindhi. Their source has generally been the older language's series of plain voiced stops, thus Sanskrit  > Saraiki  'be born'. New plain voiced stops have in turn arisen out of certain consonants and consonant clusters (for example,  >  'barley'), or have been introduced in loanwords from Sanskrit, Hindi, Persian or English ( 'throat',  'bus'). The following table illustrates some of the major developments:

Within South Asia, implosives were first described for Sindhi by Stake in 1855. Later authors have noted their existence in Multani and have variously called them "recursives" or "injectives", while Grierson incorrectly treated them as "double consonants".

Writing system

In the province of Punjab, Saraiki is written using the Arabic-derived Urdu alphabet with the addition of seven diacritically modified letters to represent the implosives and the extra nasals. In Sindh the Sindhi alphabet is used. The calligraphic styles used are Naskh and Nastaʿlīq.

Historically, traders or bookkeepers wrote in a script known as kiṛakkī or laṇḍā, although use of this script has been significantly reduced in recent times. Likewise, a script related to the Landa scripts family, known as Multani, was previously used to write Saraiki. A preliminary proposal to encode the Multani script in ISO/IEC 10646 was submitted in 2011. Saraiki Unicode has been approved in 2005. The Khojiki script has also been in use, whereas Devanagari and Gurmukhi are not employed anymore.

Language use

In academia
The Department of Saraiki, Islamia University, Bahawalpur was established in 1989 and the Department of Saraiki, Bahauddin Zakariya University, Multan was established in 2006. Saraiki is taught as a subject in schools and colleges at higher secondary, intermediate and degree level.
The Allama Iqbal Open University at Islamabad, and the Al-Khair University at Bhimbir have Pakistani Linguistics Departments. They offer M.Phil. and Ph.D in Saraiki. The Associated Press of Pakistan has launched a Saraiki version of its site, as well.

Arts and literature

Khawaja Ghulam Farid (1845–1901; his famous collection is Deewan-e-Farid) and Sachal Sar Mast (1739–1829) are the most celebrated Sufi poets in Saraiki and their poems known as Kafi are still famous.

Shakir Shujabadi (Kalam-e-Shakir, Khuda Janey, Shakir Diyan Ghazlan, Peelay Patr, Munafqan Tu Khuda Bachaway, and Shakir De Dohray are his famous books) is a very well recognized modern poet.

Famous singers who have performed in Saraiki include Attaullah Khan Essa Khailwi, Pathanay Khan, Abida Parveen, Ustad Muhammad Juman, Mansoor Malangi, Talib Hussain Dard, Kamal Mahsud, and The Sketches. Many modern Pakistan singers such as Hadiqa Kiyani and Ali Zafar have also sung Saraiki folk songs.

Media

Television channels

Former Pakistan Prime Minister Yousaf Raza Gillani had said southern Punjab is rich in cultural heritage which needs to be promoted for next generations. In a message on the launch of Saraiki channel by Pakistan Television (PTV) in Multan, he is reported to have said that the step would help promote the rich heritage of 'Saraiki Belt'.

Radio
These are not dedicated Saraiki channels but  most play programmes in Saraiki.

See also
Saraikistan
Saraiki people 
List of Saraiki people
Saraiki culture
Saraiki cuisine
Saraiki literature
Saraiki diaspora

Notes

Further reading

References

Bibliography

 Asif, Saiqa Imtiaz. 2005. Siraiki Language and Ethnic Identity. Journal of Research (Faculty of Languages and Islamic Studies), 7: 9-17. Multan (Pakistan): Bahauddin Zakariya University.

 

 (This PDF contains multiple articles from the same issue.)

External links

 A review of the linguistic literature on Saraiki
 Saraiki Alphabet  with Gurmukhi equivalents
 Download Saraiki font and keyboard for Windows and Android 
 Saraiki online transliteration 
 Works by Aslam Rasoolpuri at the Internet Archive

 
Greater Punjabi languages and dialects
Languages of India
Languages of Balochistan, Pakistan
Languages of Khyber Pakhtunkhwa
Languages of Punjab, Pakistan
Languages of Sindh